NBA Coast to Coast (formerly known as NBA Fastbreak Tuesday and NBA Nation) was a weekly NBA-themed studio program which aired Tuesday nights on ESPN2.

Format
The program is different from other studio programs, such as Baseball Tonight, in that it contains live cut-ins to NBA games in-progress as well as interviews with players after games end. However, the live cut-ins are not truly live, as there is usually a gap of a few minutes between the direct feed and what ESPN is showing.

Personalities
Presently, the program is hosted by Kevin Connors, with analysts Tim Legler and Jalen Rose. The three are routinely joined by NBA insiders Ric Bucher and Marc Stein, and other NBA analysts for ESPN.

Other hosts and analysts
John Saunders (substitute host)
Kevin Frazier (host, 2002–2004)
Matt Winer (host, 2006–2009)
Bill Laimbeer (analyst, 2003–2004)
Bill Walton (analyst)
Antonio Davis (analyst)

References

ESPN2 original programming
2002 American television series debuts
2004 American television series endings
Coast to Coast
American sports television series